Maria Cristina of Savoy (Maria Cristina Carlotta Giuseppa Gaetana Efisia; 14 November 1812 – 21 January 1836) was the first Queen consort of Ferdinand II of the Two Sicilies. She died as a result of childbirth. She is venerated in the Catholic Church, having been beatified by Pope Francis.

Family
Maria Cristina was the youngest daughter of King Victor Emmanuel I of Sardinia and Archduchess Maria Teresa of Austria-Este.

Her maternal grandparents were Archduke Ferdinand of Austria-Este and Maria Beatrice Ricciarda d'Este. Ferdinand was the fourteenth child and third son born to Francis I, Holy Roman Emperor, and Maria Theresa of Austria. Maria Beatrice was the eldest daughter of Ercole III d'Este and Maria Teresa Cybo-Malaspina, Duchess of Massa and Princess of Carrara.

Queen
On 21 November 1832, Maria Cristina married Ferdinand II of the Two Sicilies. The bride was twenty years old and the groom twenty-two.

Maria Cristina was described as beautiful but also timid and shy: modest and reserved, she was never comfortable at the royal court. Her relationship to Ferdinand was not happy, and he had little patience for her nervous modesty. While she was Queen of the Two Sicilies, she prevented the use of death sentences, and was known as "the Holy Queen".

She died at the age of 23, after having given birth five days before to her only child, Francis II of the Two Sicilies.

Beatification

On 10 July 1872 she was declared to be a Servant of God, on 6 May 1937 a Venerable Servant of God, and on 3 May 2013 Pope Francis authorized a decree recognizing a miracle due to her intercession, a further stage on her process to beatification. Her beatification took place on 25 January 2014 at the Basilica of Santa Chiara (Naples), where she is buried, making her Blessed Maria Cristina of Savoy.

Ancestry

References

|-

1812 births
1836 deaths
People from Cagliari
House of Bourbon-Two Sicilies
Royal consorts of the Kingdom of the Two Sicilies
Princesses of Savoy
Burials at the Basilica of Santa Chiara
Italian beatified people
Deaths in childbirth
Beatifications by Pope Francis
Roman Catholic royal saints
Daughters of kings